Maniltoa grandiflora is a species of plant in the family Fabaceae. Common names includes handkerchief tree and pokok sapu tangan. This plant has a synonym Maniltoa brawneodes. It can grow from 5 m to 15 m. The stem is straight, round, brown and sympodial. Its leaf is green, pinnate, elongate with smooth margin, and pointed at both ends, with dimension of 7–14 cm long, 3–8 cm wide with 1–1,5 cm long petiole. Its root develops from the radicle and is brownish white. The leaves, fruits, and bark of this plant contains saponin, flavonoid, dan polyphenol.

References

grandiflora